Adrianus "Arie" Gerardus Bieshaar (15 March 1899 – 21 January 1965) was a football player from the Netherlands.

Club career
Bieshaar played the majority of his career for Haarlem, scoring 119 goals in 285 matches.

International career
He represented his native country at the 1920 Summer Olympics in Antwerp, Belgium. There he won the bronze medal with the Netherlands national football team. He earned 4 caps, scoring no goals and played his final international match in 1923 against Germany.

References

External links
 
  Dutch Olympic Committee

1899 births
1965 deaths
Footballers from Amsterdam
Association football midfielders
Dutch footballers
Netherlands international footballers
Footballers at the 1920 Summer Olympics
Medalists at the 1920 Summer Olympics
Olympic footballers of the Netherlands
Olympic bronze medalists for the Netherlands
Olympic medalists in football
HFC Haarlem players